The Micron was the second of two human-powered aircraft designed and built by Peter Wright, an engineer from Melton Mowbray, England.

Wright had previously designed and built the Wright MPA Mk 1, which first flew in 1972. The low wing loading of that design affected the flight opportunities which could be made.  The design of his second human-powered aircraft, the Micron, began in 1974 with the intent that it be robust and practical; to this end, it had a relatively high wing loading, thereby increasing flight opportunities. It was also intended to be easily assembled and transportable in a glider trailer.

The Micron was of conventional configuration. It was a low-wing monoplane, with a very streamlined fuselage and a V-tail empennage. The pilot sat in a recumbent position, pedalling a set of bicycle pedals, and powering a pusher propeller mounted on a pylon located near the front of the fuselage. Power transmission was by a cable/roller drive. The craft made extensive use of plastics, expanded polystyrene, and carbon fibre. The fuselage, tail, and upper wing surfaces were all produced using moulds.

The craft was completed by February 1976, and involved 200 hours of construction time. A month later it was reported that the Micron was undergoing trials at RAF Cranwell, and was being hangared there alongside the Jupiter and Mercury human-powered aircraft. The website Human Powered Flight reports that the craft was later converted into a single-place sailplane, which was based at the Buckminster Gliding Club.

Specifications

See also

References

External links

Human-powered aircraft
Low-wing aircraft
Pusher aircraft
V-tail aircraft
Single-engined pusher aircraft
1970s British experimental aircraft